Bolshoy Talmaz is a rural locality (a selo) and the administrative center of Talmazskoye Rural Settlement, Kuyedinsky District, Perm Krai, Russia. The population was 231 as of 2010. There are 4 streets.

Geography 
Bolshoy Talmaz is located 23 km northwest of Kuyeda (the district's administrative centre) by road. Maly Talmaz is the nearest rural locality.

References 

Rural localities in Kuyedinsky District